Una Mullally is an Irish journalist and broadcaster from Dublin. She is a columnist with The Irish Times.

Background
Mullally grew-up in Deansgrange in South County Dublin and attended Coláiste Íosagáin where she was head girl in her final year before going on to study at Dublin City University.

Career
Mullally was previously a staff reporter and columnist with the Sunday Tribune and a columnist with The Dubliner. and presented the alternative music show Ceol ar an Imeall ("Music on the Edge") for TG4. She was one of the judges for the 2007 Choice Music Prize. She began blogging at "Pop Life" for The Irish Times in 2012.

She wrote the history book In the Name of Love documenting the movement for same-sex marriage in Ireland. The BAI subsequently upheld complaints against RTÉ and Newstalk for comments on marriage equality by Mr Mooney and Mr Donoghue - in respect of on-air interviews that Mullaly did to promote the book - ruling that their comments breached guidelines on balanced broadcasting. Mullaly complained that these findings effectively denied her on-air publicity.

In an article published in The Irish Times on 27 April 2015, Mullally discussed the difficulties of acknowledging being gay in the context of a diagnosis she had recently received—that of colorectal cancer. When the nurse was taking details of her next-of-kin, Mullally admitted to hesitating before mentioning her partner, Sarah. Mullally's article was well-received; in an interview with Ray D'Arcy on RTÉ Radio 1, she confirmed the cancer had spread to her lymph nodes.

In March 2015, Mullally won Journalist of the Year at the GALA LGBT Awards.  She lives in Dublin. Originally from the Southside, she lives on the Northside of the city.

References

External links
 Una Mullally at The Irish Times ("Pop Life")

1980s births
Journalists from Dublin (city)
Living people
Irish bloggers
Irish columnists
Irish LGBT broadcasters
Irish LGBT journalists
Sunday Tribune people
TG4 presenters
The Irish Times people
Irish women bloggers
Irish women columnists
Irish women journalists